Elijah Kain Martin (born July 4, 1996) is an American professional soccer player who plays as a defender for San Diego Loyal in the USL Championship.

Youth
From Fresno, California, Martin played for Cal Odyssey of the U.S. Development Academy for three years before joining the USL PDL side of the IMG Academy in 2013. Martin joined the LA Galaxy U-17/18 squad for the 2013–2014 U.S. Soccer Development Academy season.

Professional career
Before the 2014 USL Pro season, Martin signed for the LA Galaxy II squad, the reserve side of the LA Galaxy of Major League Soccer. Martin then made his debut for the Galaxy II side on June 8, 2014 against the Dayton Dutch Lions. He came on as a halftime substitute for Dragan Stojkov as the Galaxy II won 5–1. He left the club following the 2015 season.

Martin was announced on April 14, 2016, as a member of the initial roster for the Tampa Bay Rowdies' NPSL reserve side Rowdies 2.

International
Martin has played for the United States U17 side during the 2013 CONCACAF U-17 Championship.

Career statistics

References

External links 
 Top Drawer Soccer profile

1996 births
Living people
Sportspeople from Fresno, California
American soccer players
IMG Academy Bradenton players
LA Galaxy II players
Association football midfielders
Soccer players from California
USL League Two players
National Premier Soccer League players
USL Championship players
United States men's youth international soccer players
Tampa Bay Rowdies 2 players
Fresno Fuego players
Fresno FC players
San Diego Loyal SC players